The following units and commanders took part in the Battle of Königgrätz on July 3, 1866. Compiled from the Prussian Army's Official History of the war.

Ranks and translations

Prussian Armies
King William I of Prussia

General der Infanterie Helmuth von Moltke

First Army
General der Kavallerie Prince Friedrich Karl of Prussia

Chief of Staff: Generalleutnant Konstantin Bernhard von Voigts-Rhetz

III Corps
General der Kavallerie Prince Friedrich Karl of Prussia

IV Corps

II Corps
Generalleutnant Stephan von Schmidt

Cavalry Corps
General der Kavallerie Prince Albert of Prussia

Second Army
General der Infanterie Crown Prince Frederick William of Prussia

Chief of Staff: Generalmajor Leonhard Graf von Blumenthal

Guard Corps
General der Kavallerie Prince August of Württemberg

I Corps
General der Infanterie Adolf von Bonin

V Corps
General der Infanterie Karl Friedrich von Steinmetz

VI Corps
General der Kavallerie Louis von Mutius

Elbe Army
General der Infanterie Karl Eberhard Herwarth von Bittenfeld

Chief of Staff: Colonel Ludwig von Schlotheim

I Reserve Corps
Generalleutnant Gustav von der Mülbe

Austrian North Army
Feldzeugmeister Ludwig von Benedek

Chief of Staff: Feldmarschall-Leutnant Alfred von Henikstein

1st Corps
General der Kavallerie Eduard Clam-Gallas

Deputy: General-Major Leopold Gondrecourt

2nd Corps
Feldmarschall-Leutnant Karl von Thun und Hohenstein

Deputy: General-Major Josip Filipović

3rd Corps
Feldmarschall-Leutnant Archduke Ernest

Deputy: General-Major Alois von Baumgarten

4th Corps
Feldmarschall-Leutnant Tassilo Festetics de Tolna

Deputy: Feldmarschall-Leutnant Anton Mollinary von Monte Pastello

6th Corps
Feldmarschall-Leutnant Wilhelm von Ramming

Deputy: General-Major August Kochmeister

8th Corps
Feldmarschall-Leutnant Archduke Leopold Ludwig

Deputy: General-Major Joseph Weber

10th Corps
Feldmarschall-Leutnant Ludwig von Gablenz

Deputy: General-Major Alexander Freiherr von Koller

Reserve Cavalry

Saxon Army
General der Infanterie Crown Prince Albert of Saxony

Notes

Sources

Orders of battle
Austro-Prussian War